The 1955–56 season was the 83rd season of competitive football in Scotland and the 59th season of the Scottish Football League.

Overview
Following league reconstruction, the top tier was expanded from 16 to 18 teams with Airdrieonians and Dunfermline Athletic being promoted. The second tier was expanded from 16 to 19 teams with Berwick Rangers, Dumbarton, East Stirlingshire, Montrose and Stranraer joining the league from the third tier.

The leagues were rebranded at the start of season 1955–56. Division A was now the newly named Division One and Division B was now the newly named Division Two. Division C was disbanded, with most of its members, which were reserve teams, moving to a separate Scottish (Reserve) League).

Scottish League Division One

Champions: Rangers
Relegated: Clyde, Stirling Albion

Scottish League Division Two

Promoted: Queen's Park, Ayr United

Cup honours

Other Honours

County

 - aggregate over two legs - replay

Highland League

Scotland national team

Key:
 (H) = Home match
 (A) = Away match
 BHC = British Home Championship

Notes and references

External links
Scottish Football Historical Archive

 
Seasons in Scottish football